Tribute is a ballet made by Christopher d'Amboise to music by Johann Sebastian Bach. The première took place Saturday, June 4, 2005, at the School of American Ballet workshop performance, Juilliard Theater, Lincoln Center for the Performing Arts. The New York City Ballet première was Sunday, February 4, 2007, at the New York State Theater, also at Lincoln Center.

Music 

 Well-Tempered Clavier, Book 1, Prélude in Eb minor, BWV9 853
 Keyboard Concerto V, in F minor, 1st Movement, Allegro, BWV 1056
 Well-Tempered Clavier, Book 1, Fugue in C minor, BWV 847
 Keyboard Concerto V, in F minor, 2nd Movement Adagio''', BWV 1056
 Well-Tempered Clavier, Book 1, Prélude in E minor, BWV 856
 Well-Tempered Clavier, Book 1, Prélude in D minor, BWV 851
 Oboe Concerto, in F Major, 2nd Movement, Siciliano, reconstructed from BWV 49, 169
 Keyboard Concerto, in G minor, 1st Movement, BWV 1058

 Oboe Concerto, in D minor, 2nd Movement Adagio'', BWV 974 by Alessandro Marcello, arranged for piano solo by Johann Sebastian Bach

Reviews 
NY Times review by Jennifer Dunning, June 8, 2005
NY Times article by Daniel J. Wakin, August 1, 2006
NY Times review by Gia Kourlas, January 21, 2007

Ballets by Christopher d'Amboise
New York City Ballet repertory
2005 ballet premieres
Ballets to the music of Johann Sebastian Bach